St. Nicholas Greek Orthodox Cathedral is a Greek Orthodox parish and center for Greek-American life in Tarpon Springs, Florida. Its noted Neo-Byzantine church is located at 36 North Pinellas Avenue.

St. Nicholas hosts an annual Epiphany celebration on January 6, in which Greek Orthodox boys aged 16 to 18 dive into Spring Bayou to retrieve a white wooden cross, said to bring the finder blessings for the year. It is the largest such event in the Western Hemisphere, with thousands in attendance. A statue of an epiphany diver is located in front of the church.

Architecture
The domed main church building, designed by the Eugene Brothers of Chicago, was completed in 1943. Modeled in part after the Hagia Sophia in what is now Istanbul, it melds Byzantine and Gothic Revival styles. It is a local landmark which has been featured on postcards. 

Noted features include 23 stained glass windows surrounding the dome depicting episodes in the life of Jesus and the saints, hand-painted by Joseph V. Llorens of Atlanta, and the sixty ton altar, made of Pentelic marble. Within the dome are three large chandeliers imported from Czechoslovakia. The altar was originally part of the Greek exhibit at the 1939 New York World's Fair. It, along with the cathedra, choir stalls, and other components were obtained with help from George Frantzis. A new altar of Carrara marble was installed in 1965.

The interior is richly decorated with icons, many by Greek iconographer George Saclaridis. Forty-one icons, sponsored by various members of the parish, were delivered in 1952, with more added in subsequent years. On December 4, 1969, the icon of Saint Nicholas was observed to have drops of moisture, and some consider it a Weeping Icon.

History
The community traces its history to John Cocoris, a native of Leonidio in Arcadia, Greece, who settled in the area in 1896 and became a prosperous sponge diver and trader. The trade attracted Greek immigrants as well as Greeks from other parts of the U.S. By 1907, the population was large enough to support a Greek Orthodox church, a project put under the supervision of Nicholas Peppas, a native of Aegina. The first church, completed that year at a cost of $300 for the land and $3,500 for construction, was a wood frame structure painted white. Rev. Stamatis Koutouzis was appointed the first parish priest. The parish added a school in 1925.

By 1935, the parish had outgrown the first church and began raising funds toward current structure. Construction began in 1941 and was completed in 1943, when it was consecrated by Archbishop Athenagoras (later Patriarch) at Epiphany. St. Nicholas was by then a significant center of community life as well, with major festivals surrounding Epiphany, Greek Independence Day, and Orthodox Easter. Honoring this, in 1975, the Tarpon Springs Board of Commissioners passed a resolution designating the city the "Epiphany City" of the United States. St. Nicholas was elevated to cathedral status for West Florida in January of 1979.

In January of 2006, His All-Holiness Ecumenical Patriarch Bartholomew, spiritual leader of the Eastern Orthodox Church, came to St. Nicholas to preside over the Centennial Epiphany service and to throw the cross during the dive.

References

External links
Church website
Interior photo

Churches in Pinellas County, Florida
Greek-American culture in Florida
Churches completed in 1943
Church buildings with domes
Buildings and structures in Tarpon Springs, Florida
1907 establishments in Florida
Greek Orthodox churches in the United States
Byzantine Revival architecture in the United States